Émile Bouhours (3 June 1870 – 7 October 1953) was a French racing cyclist. He won the 1900 Paris–Roubaix race. Bouhours also competed in the 1899 Paris-Dijon race, as well as riding but not finishing the 1913 Tour de France and the Paris - Tours race of the same year.

References

External links
 

1870 births
1953 deaths
French male cyclists
Sportspeople from Orne
Cyclists from Normandy